Frederick Eden Pargiter (1852–18 February 1927) was a British civil servant and Orientalist.

Born in 1852, Pargiter was the second son of Rev. Robert Pargiter. He studied at Taunton Grammar School and Exeter College, Oxford where he passed in 1873 with a first-class in mathematics. Pargiter passed the Indian Civil Service examinations and embarked for India in 1875.

Pargiter served in India from 1875 to 1906 becoming Under-Secretary to the Government of Bengal in 1885, District and Sessions Court judge in 1887 and a judge of the Calcutta High Court in 1904. Pargiter voluntarily retired in 1906 following the death of his wife and returned to the United Kingdom.

Pargiter died at Oxford on 18 February 1927 in his seventy-fifth year.

In his Ancient Indian Historical Tradition, taking the accession of Chandragupta Maurya in 321 BC as his reference point, Pargiter dated the Battle of Kurukshetra to 950 BC assigning an average of 14.48 years for each king mentioned in the Puranic lists.

Works

Notes

References 
 
 

1852 births
1927 deaths
Indian Civil Service (British India) officers
Alumni of Exeter College, Oxford
British orientalists
Judges of the Calcutta High Court
British India judges